Gap Band VI is the eighth album (contrary to the title) by the Gap Band, released in 1984 on Total Experience Records. It was originally intended to be lead singer Charlie Wilson's first solo album, and the first Gap Band album released under Total Experience's new distribution deal with RCA Records. The album reached #1 on the Black Albums chart for 2 weeks in March 1985. On October 29, 2012 the remastered and expanded album including 5 bonus tracks was released by Big Break Records.

Track listing

(*) Bonus tracks on the remastered version

Personnel

Artist:

Charlie Wilson - Keyboards, Synthesizer, Percussion, Lead and Backing Vocals
Ronnie Wilson - Trumpet, Keyboards, Backing Vocals
Robert Wilson - Bass, Backing Vocals

Musicians:

Oliver Scott
Fred Jenkins
Billy Young
Glenn Nightingale
Raymond Calhoun
Lonnis Simmons
Rudy Taylor
Jimmy Hamilton
Maurice Hayes
Ira Ward
Robert "Goodie" Whitfield

References
[ Allmusic]
Discogs

External links
 
 Gap Band VI at Discogs
 Facebook Page
 Myspace Page
 Encyclopedia of Oklahoma History and Culture - Gap Band
 The Gap Band at WhoSampled
 Charlie Wilson in-depth interview by Pete Lewis, 'Blues & Soul' August 2011
 Charlie Wilson 2011 Interview at Soulinterviews.com

1984 albums
The Gap Band albums
Total Experience Records albums
Albums recorded at Total Experience Recording Studios